Thomas Mulvany (1 March 1868 - 16 June 1943) was the Roman Catholic Bishop of Meath, Ireland from 1929 to his death in 1943.

Early life and ministry 
Mulvany was born in the townland of Skearke Moynalty, County Meath on the 1 March 1864 to James Mulvany and Mary Monaghan.  He was ordained a priest of the Diocese of Meath on 6 March 1892.

Episcopal Ministry 
Following his predecessors death, Pope Pius XI named him Bishop of Meath on 12 April 1929 and he was consecrated on 30 June of that year, with Cardinal Joseph MacRory being the principal consecrator. He retained that position until his death in Mullingar on 16 June 1943. He died in the Bishops Palace, Mullingar, and is buried in the Cathedral grounds.

New Cathedral
At the time of his appointment, Mulvaney became involved with plans for a new Cathedral for Mullingar and the Diocese of Meath to replace the aging Cathedral of the Immaculate Conception (1836-1936).  He took the plans to Pope Pius XI who was supportive and requested that the new building be dedicated as The Cathedral of Christ the King. The building was completed from 1932 - 1936.

Dr. Mulvany opened St. Patrick's Classical School Navan in the former study hall of St. Finians College, Navan (which had moved to Mullingar).

References

External links
 Website of the Diocese of Meath

1868 births
1943 deaths
Roman Catholic bishops of Meath
20th-century Roman Catholic bishops in Ireland